E Jingping (born January 1956) is a Chinese engineer and politician who served as Minister of Water Resources from 2018 to 2021.

He was an alternate member of the 18th CPC Central Committee and is a member of the 19th CPC Central Committee.

Early life and education
E Jingping was born in Laoting County, Hebei in January 1956. In the heyday of the Cultural Revolution in 1973, his studies was interrupted by the Down to the Countryside Movement, he became a sent-down youth and worked in Baishan Commune of Lishu County, in northeast China's Jilin province. In September 1975, he was accepted to Jilin Hydropower School and graduated in August 1977. In January 1977 he joined the Communist Party of China. After graduation, he became an official in Jilin Water Conservancy Design Institute, serving in the post until September 1979, when he entered North China University of Water Resources and Electric Power.

Career
After graduating in August 1983, he was assigned to the Ministry of Water Resources, he served in several posts there, including secretary, department chief and  director. In June 1994 he was promoted to become director and party branch secretary of Yellow River Conservancy Commission, he remained in that positions until May 2001, when he was appointed secretary general of the Office of State Flood Control and Drought Relief Headquarters. In August 2003 he was promoted again to become vice-minister of Water Resources. On March 19, 2018, he was elected minister of Water Resources at the first session of the 13th National People's Congress. He concurrently serving as director of the Office of the South-to-North Water Diversion Project Commission of the State Council  and deputy commander of the Office of State Flood Control and Drought Relief Headquarters since July 2010.

References 

1956 births
Engineers from Hebei
Living people
North China University of Water Conservancy and Electric Power alumni
People's Republic of China politicians from Hebei
Chinese Communist Party politicians from Hebei
Alternate members of the 18th Central Committee of the Chinese Communist Party
Members of the 19th Central Committee of the Chinese Communist Party
Chinese hydrologists